Uthamar Kovil (also known as Thirukkarambanoor or Bhikshandar Kovil) in Uthamarkoil, a village in the outskirts of Tiruchirappalli in the South Indian state of Tamil Nadu, is dedicated to the Hindu Trimurti of Vishnu, Shiva, and Brahma. Constructed in the Dravidian style of architecture, the temple is glorified in the Nalayira Divya Prabandham, the early medieval Tamil canon of the Alvar saints from the 6th–9th centuries CE. It is one of the 108 Divya Desams dedicated to Vishnu, who is worshipped as Purushothaman Perumal (also called as Purushothamar) and his consort Lakshmi as Poornavalli Thayar.

Purushottamar is believed to have appeared to Hindu gods Brahma and Shiva, to relieve Shiva off his sins committed while cutting one of Brahma's heads. The temple is one of the few historical temples in India where the images of the Trimurti, Vishnu, Shiva and Brahma are housed in the same premises. It is one of the two temples in Chola Nadu where the trinity can be seen in the same premises, the other being Hara Saabha Vimocchana Perumal Temple at Thirukkandiyur.

The temple is believed to have been built by the Medieval Cholas of the late 8th century CE, with later contributions from Vijayanagara kings and Madurai Nayaks. A granite wall surrounds the temple, enclosing all its shrines, while the temple tank is located outside the main gateway.

Six daily rituals and four yearly festivals are held at the temple for each of trinities. The major festival of the temple, the Brahmotsavam, is celebrated during the Tamil month of Kartikai (November – December) when festival images of both Purushotamar and Bikshadanar are carried together in the streets surrounding the temple. The temple is maintained and administered by the Hindu Religious and Endowment Board of the Government of Tamil Nadu.

Etymology and legend

As per Hindu legend, the god Vishnu emerged as a Kadamba tree here, giving the name Kathambanur, which later became Karambanur. The name Karambanur is mentioned by Thirumangai Alvar in Nalayira Divya Prabandam, in which he refers to the presiding deity as "Karambanur Uthaman". The temple is commonly called "Uthamar Kovil" derived from the presiding deity. The temple is also called Bhikshandar Kovil as the god Shiva is present in the form of Bhikshandar (a mendicant) and believed to have attained cure by worshiping Vishnu at this place.

As per Hindu legend, once Vishnu wanted to test the devotion of the god Brahma. He raised as a Kadamba tree in the place; Brahma worshipped him with thirumanjanam (ablution). The water from the ablution filled a tank nearby, which came to be known as "Kathamba Theertham". Vishnu was satisfied with the devotion of Brahma and gave a boon to Brahma to have a shrine in this place. Shiva wanted to expiate the sin for decapitating a head of Brahma and went on a pilgrimage. Here, Vishnu requested his consort Lakshmi to give alms to Shiva. Shiva's grail was filled by the alms and Lakshmi came to be known as Poornavalli Thayar (the one who filled the grail).

As per another legend, Brahma and Shiva both had originally five heads. Parvati, the wife of Shiva, once got confused and worshipped Brahma, instead of her husband. Shiva got enraged and cut off one of Brahma's heads; the head stuck in Shiva's hand due to Brahma's curse. To atone for the sin, Shiva worshipped Vishnu here; Shiva was fully relieved of the curse after worshipping Vishnu at Hara Saabha Vimocchana Perumal Temple.

According to another Hindu legend, the temple is believed to have been constructed by Janaka, the king of Janakapuri and the father of the goddess Sita. Thirumangai Alvar is believed to have resided in the temple to build the surrounding walls of the Srirangam Ranganathaswamy temple.

Temple

The temple is believed to have been built by the Medieval Cholas of the late 8th century CE, with later contributions from Vijayanagara kings and Madurai Nayaks. During the war between British and French in 1751, the temple acted as an infantry for both the troops. There was no damage done to the temple during the war.

A granite wall surrounds the temple, enclosing all its shrines. The temples has images and separate shrines for Purushottamar (Vishnu), Bhikshadanar (Shiva), Brahma and their respective consorts Poornavalli (Lakshmi), Soundaraya Parvati and Saraswati. This is one of the few historical Hindu temples in the world, where the Hindu Trimurti are worshipped along with their consorts in six separate shrines within the same temple complex. The central shrine facing East houses the image of Vishnu, as Purushottamar, in reclining posture with the discus in one hand. The roof or vimana of the central shrine is called Udhyoga Vimana. There are two shrines located to the south east, each housing the image of Poornavalli and Mahalakshmi. The Shiva shrine, located behind Vishnu's, houses the lingam (aniconic form of Shiva) as Bhikshadanar. The granite images of the deities Ganesha (son of Shiva and god of wisdom), Murugan (son of Shiva and god of war), Nandi (the bull and vehicle of Shiva) and Navagraha (nine planetary deities) are located in the hall leading to the Shiva sanctum. As in other Shiva temples of Tamil Nadu, the first precinct of the Shiva shrine has images of Dakshinamurthy (Shiva as the Teacher), Durga (warrior-goddess) and Chandikeswarar (a saint and devotee of Shiva). The shrines of Brahma and his consort Saraswati are located in the south west corner of the temple complex.

The Saptaguru or seven gurus (teachers) are identified in the temple. The seven are Bhikshadanar (representing Sadasiva Guru, Shiva as a guru), Brahma (Brahma Guru), Soundarya Parvati (Shakti Guru, the Goddess as a guru), Brihaspati (Deva Guru, the teacher of the gods), Varadarajaperumal (Vishnu Guru), Murugan (Gnana Guru, the guru of knowledge) and Shukra (Asura Guru, the guru of demons).

Festival and administration

The temple priests perform the puja (rituals) during festivals and on a daily basis. The priests of the Bhikshadanar shrine belong to the Shaiva community, while the priests of Purushothamar are from Vaishnava community. The temple rituals are performed six times a day; Ushathkalam at 5:30 a.m., Kalasanthi at 8:00 a.m., Uchikalam at 10:00 a.m., Sayarakshai at 5:00 p.m., Irandamkalam at 7:00 p.m. and Ardha Jamam at 8:30 p.m. The Shaiva and Vaishnava sects have their own rituals. The ritual of Bhikshadanar comprises four steps: abhisheka (sacred bath), alangaram (decoration), naivethanam (food offering) and deepa aradanai (waving of lamps) for both Bhikshadanar and Soundarya Parvati. The worship is held amidst religious instructions in the Vedas (sacred texts) read by priests and prostration by worshippers in front of the temple mast. The major festival of the temple, the Brahmotsavam, is celebrated during the Tamil month of Kartigai (November – December) when festival images of both Purushothamar and Bhikshadanar are carried together in the streets surrounding the temple. Kadambha Tiruvila is a festival celebrated in the temple when the festival image of Ranganatha (a form of Vishnu) is brought to the Kadambha tank of the temple for Theerthavari. The temple is maintained and administered by the Hindu Religious and Endowment Board of the Government of Tamil Nadu.

Religious significance

Uthamar Kovil is one of the two temples in Chola Nadu where the trinity can be seen in the same premises, the other being Hara Saabha Vimocchana Perumal Temple at Thirukkandiyur. Trimurti in Hindu mythology refers to the cosmic functions of creation, maintenance, and destruction. They are personified by the forms of Brahma the creator, Vishnu the preserver, and Shiva, the destroyer.

The temple is revered in Nalayira Divya Prabandham, the 7th–9th century Vaishnava canon, by Thirumangai Alvar in ten hymns. The temple is classified as a Divya Desam, one of the 108 Vishnu temples that are mentioned in the book. Thirumangai Alvar have sung in praise of the perumal in this temple with one pasuram (hymn).

Periyavachan Pillai, who translated the verses of Thirumangai Alvar, glorifies the temple as "the one without doors where devotees can always visit and worship".

References

External links

 
Hindu temples in Tiruchirappalli district
Brahma temples
Shiva temples in Tiruchirappalli district